Muhammad Syafiq bin Ahmad (born 28 June 1995) is a Malaysian professional footballer who plays as forward for Malaysia Super League club Johor Darul Ta'zim and the Malaysia national team.

Early life
Syafiq was born and raised in Sungai Ara in the state of Penang, Malaysia. As a child Syafiq represented his school, Sekolah Menengah Tunku Anum Tunku Abdul Rahman for tournaments under the age of 15 and 18.

Club career
Syafiq made his debut in the Malaysian League with Kedah on 20 August 2013 against LionsXII in a Malaysia Cup match. He came in from the bench on the 81st minute. His first Malaysia Premier League match is against Perlis on 24 January 2014 where Kedah won 4-1. On 16 May 2014, he scored his first league goal against Felda United which also the winning goal.

Syafiq signed by Johor Darul Ta'zim (JDT) on December 2017. He made his JDT debut in AFC Champions League preliminary round against Muangthong United on 23 January 2018.

International career
Syafiq participated in the 2015 Southeast Asian Games with Malaysia U-23. He also participated in the 2017 Southeast Asian Games where Malaysia U-23 finished as silver medalist. He also played in the 2018 Asian Games. He made his debut with Malaysia senior team in 2019 AFC Asian Cup qualification against North Korea on 13 November 2017. In the 2019 AFC Asian Cup qualification away match against Lebanon, he scored his first senior international goal.

Personal life 
On 6 December 2020, Syafiq was driving when he got into an accident that killed 3 people. His 22 day old son, mother-in-law, and maid all died in the accident. Syafiq, his wife, and their 2 year old daughter survived the crash.

Career statistics

Club

International

International goals

Senior team
Scores and results list Malaysia's goal tally first.

Malaysia U-23

Honours

Club
Kedah
 Malaysia Premier League: 2015
 Malaysian FA Cup: 2017
 Malaysia Cup: 2016
 Malaysia Charity Shield: 2017

Johor Darul Ta'zim
 Malaysia Super League: 2018, 2019, 2020, 2021
 Malaysia Cup: 2019, 2022
 Malaysia Charity Shield: 2019, 2020

International
Malaysia U-23
Southeast Asian Games
 Silver Medal: 2017

Malaysia
 AFF Championship runner-up: 2018
King's Cup runner-up: 2022

References

External links
 

1995 births
Living people
Malaysian footballers
Kedah Darul Aman F.C. players
Johor Darul Ta'zim F.C. players
Malaysia Super League players
Malaysian people of Malay descent
People from Penang
Southeast Asian Games silver medalists for Malaysia
Southeast Asian Games medalists in football
Footballers at the 2018 Asian Games
Malaysia international footballers
Association football forwards
Competitors at the 2017 Southeast Asian Games
Asian Games competitors for Malaysia